Ḫamsa is a Near Eastern symbol often used as a protective amulet.

Hamsa or may also refer to:

 Hamsa (bird)
 Hamsa (literature)
 Hamsa (musical group) (חמסה), an Israeli musical quintet
 Ali Hamsa (1955-2022), Malaysian politician
 M. Hamsa (born 1955), Indian politician
 A subsidiary Purana in Hinduism
 A mantra, see

See also
Hamza (Arabic-language diacritical marking)
Hamza (disambiguation)
Khamsa (disambiguation)